Noé Hernández may refer to:

Noé Hernández González (born 1965), Mexican politician
Noé Hernández (actor) (born 1969), Mexican actor
Noé Hernández (racewalker) (1978–2013), Mexican race walker